Chris Harris FREng is a control engineer, and Emeritus Professor of Computational Intelligence at the University of Southampton, UK.

Education
Harris was born and educated in Portsmouth, Hampshire, and he received his university education at the University of Leicester (BSc), his MA from Oxford University, and Ph.D. from University of Southampton, UK.

Career
Harris had previously worked at the Universities of Hull, UMIST, Oxford, Imperial, and Cranfield, He had also worked at the UK Ministry of Defence, MoD. He had authored or co-authored 12 books and over 300 research papers. He was the associate editor of numerous international journals including Automatica, Engineering Applications of AI, International Journal of General Systems Engineering, International Journal of System Science and the International Journal on Mathematical Control and Information Theory.

Research
Harris's research interests include intelligent and adaptive systems theory and its application to intelligent autonomous 
systems, management infrastructures, intelligent control, dynamic processes, multi-sensor data
fusion and systems integration.

Awards
Harris was elected to the Royal Academy of Engineering in 1996. He was awarded the IEE Senior Achievement medal in 1998 
for his work on autonomous systems, and the IEE highest award, the Faraday medal, in 2001 for his work in Intelligent Control and Neurofuzzy System.

References

External links
 Biography 
 Google Scholar 

Living people
Academics of the University of Southampton
Alumni of the University of Leicester
Alumni of the University of Oxford
Alumni of the University of Southampton
English electrical engineers
Fellows of the Royal Academy of Engineering
Engineers from Portsmouth
Year of birth missing (living people)